Michael James Shanks (12 April 1927, London – 13 January 1984, London) was a British economic journalist.

Throughout the 1950s, Shanks was a writer and editor at the Financial Times, and in 1964/5 he became the economic correspondent with the Sunday Times. His Penguin Special book The Stagnant Society (1961) sold 60,000 copies.

Books 

 The Stagnant Society. Harmondsworth 1961

External links 
 Entry in Oxford Dictionary of National Biography

1927 births
1984 deaths
Treasurers of the Fabian Society
20th-century British journalists